Giuseppe Pellicanò (born 24 March 1954 in Reggio Calabria) is a retired Italian professional footballer who played as a goalkeeper.

1954 births
Living people
Italian footballers
Association football goalkeepers
Serie A players
Serie B players
ACF Fiorentina players
Empoli F.C. players
S.S. Arezzo players
S.S.C. Bari players